Nicolas-Jacques Conté (4 August 1755 – 6 December 1805) was a French painter, balloonist, army officer, and inventor of the modern pencil.

He was born at Saint-Céneri-près-Sées (now Aunou-sur-Orne) in Normandy and distinguished himself for his mechanical genius, which was of great avail to the French army in Egypt. Napoleon called him “a universal man with taste, understanding and genius capable of creating the arts of France in the middle of the Arabian Desert”.

Aeronautics
One of his early interests while still at Sées was in the newly developing science of aeronautics. He made at least one hot-air balloon, which he flew in the public square. He contributed to the improvement of the production of hydrogen gas, as well as the treatment of the gas bag of the balloon itself.

In Egypt, Conté was called on to exercise his expertise in ballooning and was asked to prepare an ascent for the celebration of the French New Year on 22 September 1798. He was not sufficiently prepared, so the event was postponed to 1 December. On that occasion his efforts met with a near disaster. The balloon caught fire, and the Egyptians received the impression that what had been demonstrated was a machine of war for setting fire to the enemy encampments. At a second attempt with a larger balloon, it is said that the ascent was witnessed in Esbekia Square by 100,000. It is probable that the use of the balloon in Egypt was limited to impressing the local population and was never found suitable for military purposes. Al-Jabarti, (‘Abd al-Rahman al-Jabarti al-Misri) in his account of the ascent said: “Their claim that this apparatus is like a vessel in which people sit and travel to other countries in order to discover news and other falsifications did not appear to be true.”

Writing and drawing equipment
Conté invented the modern pencil lead at the request of Lazare Nicolas Marguerite Carnot. The French Republic was at that time under economic blockade and unable to import graphite from Great Britain, the main source of the material. Carnot asked Conté to create a pencil that did not rely on foreign imports. After several days of research, Conté had the idea of mixing powdered graphite with clay and pressing the material between two half-cylinders of wood. Thus was formed the modern pencil. Conté received a patent for the invention in 1795 and formed la Société Conté to make them. He also invented the conté crayon named after him, a hard pastel stick used by artists.

At the 1798 Exposition des produits de l'industrie française Conté won an honorable distinction, the highest award, for his "crayons of various colours".

References

 

1755 births
1805 deaths
18th-century French painters
French male painters
19th-century French painters
Commission des Sciences et des Arts members
19th-century French male artists
18th-century French male artists